The Seattle metropolitan area is an urban conglomeration in the U.S. state of Washington that comprises  Seattle, its surrounding satellites and suburbs. It contains the three most populous counties in the state—King, Pierce, and Snohomish — and is considered part of the greater Puget Sound region. The United States Census Bureau defines the metropolitan area as the Seattle–Tacoma–Bellevue, WA metropolitan statistical area. With an estimated population of 4,102,400 , it is the 15th largest metropolitan statistical area (MSA) in the United States and is home to over half of Washington's population.

Definition 

As defined by the United States Census Bureau, the Seattle metropolitan area is made up of the following (see Fig. STB):

 Seattle–Bellevue–Everett metropolitan division
 King County: Seattle and its immediate vicinity
 Snohomish County: north of Seattle
 Tacoma metropolitan division
 Pierce County: south of Seattle

Based on commuting patterns, the adjacent metropolitan areas of Olympia, Bremerton, and Mount Vernon, along with a few smaller satellite urban areas, are grouped together in a wider labor market region known as the Seattle–Tacoma Combined Statistical Area (CSA) (See Figure STO), commonly known as the Puget Sound region. The population of this wider region is 4,686,536—roughly two-thirds of Washington's population—. The Seattle CSA is the 14th largest CSA, and the 13th largest primary census statistical area in the country.  The additional metropolitan and micropolitan areas included are:

 Bremerton–Silverdale metropolitan area
 Kitsap County: west of Seattle, separated from the city by Puget Sound; connected to Seattle by ferry and to Tacoma by the Tacoma Narrows Bridge
 Olympia metropolitan area
 Thurston County: southwest of Seattle, at the south end of Puget Sound
 Mount Vernon–Anacortes metropolitan area
 Skagit County
 Oak Harbor micropolitan area
 Island County: northwest of Everett, encompassing Whidbey and Camano Islands in Puget Sound
 Shelton micropolitan area
 Mason County: west of Tacoma and northwest of Olympia

Demographics 

As of the 2020 census there was 4,018,762 people in the area. In 2019 the estimated median income for a household in the Seattle metropolitan area was $94,027. The per capita income was $49,184.

Religion 

According to the Pew Research Center's 2014 U.S. Religious Landscape Study, the Seattle metropolitan area's religious affiliation is as follows:

Cities 

 Major

 Seattle
 Tacoma
 Bellevue
 Kent
 Everett

 Other

Arlington
Auburn
Bainbridge Island
Beaux Arts Village
Bonney Lake
Bothell
Bremerton
Brier
Buckley
Burien
Covington
Des Moines
Duvall
Enumclaw
Edmonds
Federal Way
Gig Harbor
Gold Bar
Granite Falls
Issaquah
Kenmore
Kirkland
Lake Forest Park
Lake Stevens
Lakewood
Lynnwood
Maple Valley
Marysville
Mercer Island
Mill Creek
Monroe
Mountlake Terrace
Mount Vernon
Mukilteo
Newcastle
Normandy Park
Olympia
Orting
Puyallup
Poulsbo
Redmond
Renton
Sammamish
SeaTac
Shoreline
Silverdale
Snohomish
Stanwood
Sultan
Sumner
Tukwila
Woodinville
Woodway

Commerce 
The Seattle metropolitan area is home to numerous large scale businesses. Retail giants such as Microsoft, Amazon, REI, Nordstrom, Starbucks, and Costco were founded and continue to be headquartered in the greater Seattle area.

Over the past decade, tech companies began expanding their roots into the Seattle metropolitan area and opening offices on both sides of Lake Washington (Seattle and Bellevue, primarily). These companies, traditionally known for their history in Silicon Valley and the bay area, include Facebook, Salesforce, Google, and Zynga.

Transportation

Major airports 

The largest airport in the region is Seattle–Tacoma International Airport in SeaTac, an International airport that serves as a commercial hub for Alaska Airlines and Delta Air Lines.

The other airports in the area are:

 Paine Field (passenger and general)
 Boeing Field (passenger and cargo)
 Harvey Airfield (general)
 Renton Municipal Airport (general)

Major highways 

  U.S. Route 2
  Interstate 5
  State Route 7
  State Route 9
  State Route 16
  State Route 18
  Interstate 90
  State Route 99
  U.S. Route 101
  State Route 202
  Interstate 405
  State Route 520
  State Route 522
  Interstate 605 (proposed)
  Interstate 705

Mass transit 

 Sound Transit, trains, buses, light rail in Puget Sound area
 Community Transit, buses in Snohomish County except Everett
 King County Metro, buses in King County
 Pierce Transit, buses in Pierce County
 Everett Transit, bus service in the city of Everett
 Kitsap Transit, buses and ferry service in Kitsap County
 Intercity Transit, bus service in Thurston County
 Mason Transit Authority, bus service in Mason County
 Seattle Streetcar, streetcar service in the city of Seattle
Seattle Center Monorail

References 

 
Metropolitan areas of Washington (state)